The Cathedral of St. Francis Xavier , also called Kawaramachi Church, is a parish of the Roman Catholic Church in the city of Kyoto, and cathedral of the Diocese of Kyoto in Japan.

It has served as the seat of the bishop of Kyoto since its completion and dedication in November 1972. The diocese (Dioecesis Kyotensis カトリック京都教区) had been erected in 1951 by Pope Pius XII through the Bull "Inter supremi".

It is under the pastoral responsibility of the Bishop Paul Yoshinao Otsuka. Masses are offered in Japanese and English in addition to the foreign Catholic community.

See also
Catholic Church in Japan

References

Roman Catholic cathedrals in Japan
Religious buildings and structures in Kyoto
Roman Catholic churches completed in 1972
20th-century Roman Catholic church buildings in Japan